"R U Mine?" is a song by the English indie rock band Arctic Monkeys. It features lyrics written by Arctic Monkeys frontman Alex Turner, as well as music composed by the entire band. The song was released as a digital download in the United Kingdom on 27 February 2012 and was released physically for the Record Store Day on 21 April 2012 on a limited edition double A-side purple 7" vinyl along with new song "Electricity". The vinyl was limited to a run of only 1,750 copies.

"R U Mine?" debuted at number twenty-three on the UK Singles Chart; the band's highest charting single since "Crying Lightning" reached number twelve in July 2009. Despite originally being released as a standalone single, the song was later included as the lead single of their fifth studio album, AM (2013), in a slightly different version. It was later certified platinum in the UK, making it one of the Arctic Monkeys' best-selling songs.

The song was also featured in the video games Forza Horizon and Rocksmith 2014. It was also featured in the video game Guitar Hero Live. It was released as a downloadable song for the rhythm game Rock Band 3 on January 13, 2015; one of the first three downloadable songs released for Rock Band 3 in almost two years.

Inspiration 
Alex Turner said that the band drew inspiration from recent relationships, saying "There's a few references for people to pick up on in there – 'Some Velvet Morning', Tracy Island. That particular bit is like the thing Lil Wayne and Drake do. [...] I like that thing they do where they talk about something backwards, so they talk about it but then say what it actually is on the next line. [...] So I say, 'I'm a puppet on a string', just before mentioning Tracy Island. That's what it's about – uncertainty." Turner also described the track as "Kind of a lift from an Ashanti tune. We like the scales and the melodies on some of those records. The way the backing vocals might come right to the front and disappear again".

The main riff of the song was written by bassist Nick O'Malley, while the band were recording the B-side "Evil Twin".

Reception
Music magazine NME ranked the song at number 49 among 100 greatest songs of 2010s.

Music videos 
A music video to accompany the release of "R U Mine?" was first released onto YouTube on 27 February 2012 at a total length of three minutes and forty-four seconds and features radio DJ, musician and former Sex Pistols guitarist Steve Jones debuting the song on his show on American modern rock radio station KROQ-FM while Matt Helders, Alex Turner and Nick O'Malley lip-sync the song in a car. In 2013, the video won the NME Award for Best Video.

Drummer Matt Helders, who came up with the idea for the video, revealed it was directed by Focus Creeps, who 'gave [the band] a camera and told us to film'.

A second video was released onto YouTube on 29 March 2012, following their live show in Mexico City one day earlier. The video depicts a live performance of the song and shots of the excited crowd. It ends with an image of Turner's microphone with two bras hanging from it.

Track listing

Personnel
Arctic Monkeys
Alex Turner – lead vocals, lead guitar
Jamie Cook – rhythm guitar
Nick O'Malley – bass guitar, backing vocals
Matt Helders – drums, backing vocals

Charts

"R U Mine?"

Weekly charts

Year-end charts

"Electricity"

Certifications

Release history

References

2012 singles
2012 songs
Arctic Monkeys songs
Domino Recording Company singles
Songs written by Alex Turner (musician)